The Local Access Alert (also known as Local Access System or Emergency Override System) is a warning system designed to warn radio, television stations, cable television broadcast feeds or satellite signals of impending dangers, such as tornadoes, flash flooding and other civil emergencies. The system was largely replaced by the Emergency Alert System in the United States, although it still exists in some areas which have not yet been upgraded, and is still used from time to time in areas that have upgraded to the EAS.

The Local Access Alert was used by local law enforcement agencies and emergency management staff, and is much like the antiquated Emergency Broadcast System. A public servant would dial up a number and PIN through a phone to take control of a certain cable city or cluster in the path of danger. Once the number and PIN are entered, it switches all cable subscribers, regardless of what channel they're on, to a black screen or static and uses a distinct attention signal (in this case, a morse code, a siren, DTMF tones, steady single (or dual) tones, or multiple hi-lo beeps). More modern alerts use a black screen with the words "Local Access Alert" in all capital letters with a message stating that "a local authority has initiated a direct community access"; the text was generated using the Trilithic EASyPLUS character generator (the same one that was also used for the Emergency Alert System).

Police or emergency management then let viewers know of an impending disaster and instructs them to take shelter or evacuate. The problem with the Local Access Alert system is that the operators would have to dial out to end transmission. Simply hanging up the phone connected to such system after an emergency broadcast would not work, and sometimes viewers would hear other phone noises (examples: off-hook and/or a dial tone) before finally being switched back to normal cable operations. 

With a gradual transition from analog to digital cable, the Local Access Alert has been phased out and replaced by the Emergency Alert System, which employs Specific Area Message Encoding technology to activate for potential disasters and deactivate to resume cable broadcasts, especially late at night when many public servants aren't available to break in.

References

United States civil defense
Disaster preparedness in the United States
Cable television
Warning systems